Marta Sophia Lepp Utuste (born Marta Kirschbaum; 12 November 1883 – 11 November 1940), also known as Sophia Vardi and Maarda Lepp-Utuste, was an Estonian writer, editor, educator, and political and religious leader.

Early life 
Lepp was born in Varbola, the daughter of Priidik Lepp and Maria Sassi Lepp. She attended schools in Tallinn and trained as a teacher in Saint Petersburg.

Career 
For her revolutionary activities, Lepp was imprisoned in Siberia in 1905, 1907, and 1910; she escaped at least once before her official release in 1910. In 1917, she returned to Estonia, where she taught Estonian language and history in Tallinn; she was also head of a women's political organization, and was editor of a newspaper, Our Free Land. She and her husband were adherents and leaders of Taaraism, an Estonian neo-pagan religion. Her writing included short stories, an opera libretto, a novel, and a three-volume memoir.

Personal life 
Lepp married soldier Gustav Vladimir Kirschbaum (later known as ) in 1913. Their son Reljo Utuste was born in Tallinn in 1923. Their nephew was writer . She died in 1940, the day before her 57th birthday, in Tartu. There is a collection of her papers at the University of Minnesota.

References 

1883 births
1940 deaths
20th-century Estonian women writers
Estonian women novelists
Estonian dramatists and playwrights
Estonian women short story writers
Estonian modern pagans
Estonian religious leaders
People from Märjamaa Parish
Modern pagan writers